Namkha is the largest rural municipality (by area) of Nepal located in Humla District of Karnali Province.

The rural municipality is divided into 6 wards.

The rural municipality was established on 10 March 2017, when Government of Nepal restricted all old administrative structure (Village development committee) and announced 744 local level units (although the number increased to 753 later) as per the new constitution of Nepal 2015.

Hepka, Khagalgaun, Muchu and Limi Village development committees were incorporated to form this new rural municipality. The headquarters of the municipality is situated at Yalwang.

Namkha RM is located in the most North-west part of Nepal in Humla District of Karnali Province. It is surrounded by Tibet (China) from North and West. Geographically Namkha is a difficult terrain which is also an isolated region which is still not connected by road with District headquarter Simikot. It is totally located on Himalayas. Some villages of Limi is located across the himalayas. The region is known for Trekking. There is trekking route connecting Simikot to Limi, Muchu and Yalwang.

Demographics
At the time of the 2011 Nepal census, 98.3% of the population in Namkha Rural Municipality spoke Tamang and 0.9% Nepali as their first language; 0.8% spoke other languages.

In terms of ethnicity/caste, 98.7% were Tamang, 0.5% Chhetri and 0.8% others.

In terms of religion, 97.8% were Buddhist, 2.0% Hindu and 0.2% others.

References

External links
 http://www.namkhamun.gov.np/
https://www.citypopulation.de/php/nepal-mun-admin.php?adm2id=6604

Populated places in Humla District
Rural municipalities in Karnali Province
Rural municipalities of Nepal established in 2017